Perseus Freeing Andromeda is a 1611 oil on canvas painter by the Dutch Mannerist painter Joachim Wtewael. Since 1982 it has been in the collection of the Louvre, in Paris. A preparatory drawing for it also survives in the Albertina, in Vienna, reprising the pose in  the same artist's St Sebastian Bound to a Tree for Andromeda. In the final painting he used a less curving and more supple pose for Andromeda.

References

Mythological paintings
1611 paintings
Dutch Golden Age paintings
Paintings in the Louvre by Dutch, Flemish and German artists